Kuhak-e Kuchek (also Romanized as Kūhak-e Kūchek, Koohak Koochak, Kūhak-e Kūchak, Kūhak-i-Kūchak, and Kūhak Kūchek) is a village in Rudhaleh Rural District, Rig District, Ganaveh County, Bushehr Province, Iran. At the 2006 census, its population was 167, in 31 families.

References 

Populated places in Ganaveh County